Leonard Q. Gruppo (born October 6, 1942) is a former Republican member of the Pennsylvania House of Representatives.

References

Republican Party members of the Pennsylvania House of Representatives
Living people
1942 births